The Movie Show on ITV2 is a weekly British television film review show on ITV2, presented by James King. The show is a new format produced by R 'n' R Limited and commissioned by ITV2.
 
The series looks at the latest weekly film releases in the UK and each programme includes a film premiere and red carpet interviews from the west end of London, movie features and movie previews including interviews with all the stars and directors of the latest releases.

Also included in the programmes are the latest DVD, Download and Blu-ray releases, UK top 5 box office chart and James King's review of the big film releases, movie gossip and news.

External links

ITV (TV network) original programming
2011 British television series debuts
2011 British television series endings